

List of Ambassadors

Eyal Sela (Non-Resident, Jerusalem), 2016–present 
Oren David (Non-Resident, Jerusalem), 2011–2016
Gideon Meir (Non-Resident, Rome), 2006–2011
Ehud Gol (Non-Resident, Rome), 2001–2006
Yehuda Millo (Non-Resident, Rome), 1995–2001
Aviezer Pazner (Non-Resident, Rome), 1991–1995
Raphael Migdal, 1976–1979
Ehud Avriel (Non-Resident, Rome), 1966–1968

References

Malta
Israel